Herford Abbey was the oldest women's religious house in the Duchy of Saxony. It was founded as a house of secular canonesses in 789, initially in Müdehorst (near the modern Bielefeld) by a nobleman called Waltger, who moved it in about 800 onto the lands of his estate Herivurth (later Oldenhervorde) which stood at the crossing of a number of important roads and fords over the Aa and the Werre. The present city of Herford grew up on this site around the abbey.

History

9th–12th centuries 
The abbey was dedicated in 832 and was elevated to the status of a Reichsabtei ("Imperial abbey") under Emperor Louis the Pious (d. 840). In ecclesiastical matters it was answerable directly to the Pope and was endowed with a third of the estates originally intended for Corvey Abbey.

In 860, at the instigation of the abbess Haduwy (Hedwig), the bones of Saint Pusinna, later the patron saint of Herford, were brought from her hermitage at Binson ("vicus bausionensis" near Châlons-en-Champagne, Corbie). The presence of these relics in the abbey increased its importance and its dedication was changed in due course to Saints Mary and Pusinna.

In the time of the abbess Matilda I her granddaughter Matilda, later Saint Matilda, was brought up here. In 909, through the negotiations of her grandmother, she was married to Henry, Duke of Saxony and later King Henry I of Germany.

Between 919 and 924 Herford was destroyed by Hungarians but was rebuilt by 927.

Reichsunmittelbarkeit 
In 1147 the abbey, which by this time had almost 850 estates and farms, was granted Imperial immediacy. This made it an independent territory within the Holy Roman Empire (although admittedly a very small one, comprising part of the area of the present city of Herford) which lasted until 1803. The abbesses became Imperial princesses and sat in the Reichstag in the College of Prelates of the Rhine. The territory belonged to the Lower Rhenish-Westphalian Circle.

The first Vögte seem to have been the Billunger, and after they died out, Henry the Lion, who appointed the Counts of Schwalenberg as under-Vögte. From 1180, after the fall of Henry the Lion, they exercised the same function for the Archbishopric of Cologne and the Duchy of Westphalia. By 1261 the office seems to have passed to the Counts of Sternberg and in 1382 to the Counts of Jülich-Berg.

In the vicinity of the abbey there grew up the town of Herford, which had acquired municipal rights by 1170/1180 and later, as the Reichsstadt Herford, acquired Reichsunmittelbarkeit in its own right.

By the end of the 15th century, "Sancta Herfordia" ("Holy Herford"), as it became known, had some 37 churches, chapels, monasteries and other religious houses, and hospitals. Its spiritual life was thus comparable to that of a great centre such as Cologne.

Reformation 
In 1533, during the Reformation, Herford Abbey became Lutheran, under the Electors of Brandenburg. From 1649 for over a century the abbesses were all Calvinist but that did not alter the Lutheran character of the principality.

Dissolution 
In 1802 the abbey was dissolved in the course of secularisation under the terms of the Reichsdeputationshauptschluss and on 25 February 1803 was annexed to the County of Ravensberg, which belonged to the Kingdom of Prussia. In 1804 it was turned into a collegiate foundation for men, and in 1810 finally suppressed.

The former abbey church remains in use as Herford Minster (Herforder Münster).

Abbesses 

 Theodrada, Tetta (838 – after 840)
 Addila (before 844 – after 853)
 Hedwig (before 858 – after 888)
 Matilda I (before 908 – after 911; Immedinger)
 Imma (before 973 – after 995; Billunger)
 Godesdiu (before 1002 – after 1040; Billunger)
 Swanhild (before 1051–1076)
 Gertrud I (before 1138 – after 1139)
 Jutta (Jutta of Arnsberg; before 1146 – after 1162)
 Ludgard I (before 1163 – after 1170)
 Eilika (c. 1212)
 Gertrud II (Gertrud of Lippe; before 1217 – after 1233)
 Ida (before 1238 – after 1264)
 Pinnosa (before 1265 – after 1276)
 Mechthild II (Mechtild of Waldeck; before 1277 – after 1288)
 Irmgard (Irmgard of Wittgenstein; before 1290–1323)
 Lutgard II (Lutgard of Bicken; 1324–1360)
 Heilwig (Heilwig of Bentheim; 1361)
 Elisabeth I (Elisabeth of Berg; 1361–1374)
 Hillegund (Hillegund of Oetgenbach; 1374–1409)
 Mechthild III (Mechtild of Waldeck; 1409–1442)
 Margaret of Brunswick-Grubenhagen, rival abbess 1442–1443
 Margaret I (Margaret of Gleichen; 1443–1475)
 Jakobe of Neuenahr, rival abbess 1476–1479
 Anna I (Anna of Hunolstein; 1476–1494)
 Bonizet (Bonizet of Limburg-Stirum; 1494–1524)
 Anna II (Anna of Limburg; 1524–1565)
 Margaret II (Margaret of Lippe; 1565–1578)
 Felicitas I (Felicitas of Eberstein; 1578–1586)
 Magdalene I (Magdalene of Lippe; 1586–1604)
 Felicitas II (Felicitas of Eberstein; 1604–1621)
 Magdalene II (Magdalene of Lippe; 1621–1640)
 Sidonia (Sidonia of Oldenburg; 1640–1649)
 Maria Clara Theresa of Wartenberg, rival abbess 1629–1631
 Elisabeth II (Elisabeth Luise Juliana of the Palatinate-Zweibrücken; 1649–1667)
 Elisabeth III (Elisabeth of the Electorate of the Palatinate; 1667–1680)
 Elisabeth IV (Elisabeth Albertine of Anhalt-Dessau; 1680–1686)
 Elisabeth V (Elisabeth of Hesse-Cassel; 1686–1688)
 Charlotte Sophia (Charlotte Sophia of Courland; 1688–1728)
 Johanna Charlotte (Johanna Charlotte of Anhalt-Dessau; 1729–1750)
 Sophia (Sophia of Schleswig-Holstein-Gottorp; 1750–1764)
 Frederica Charlotte (Frederica Charlotte of Brandenburg-Schwedt; 1764–1802; d. 1808)
Princess Christine Charlotte of Hesse-Kassel (1766–1779) as coadjutor abbess

Notes

References 
 R. Pape: Über die Anfänge Herfords. Dissertation, 1955
 A. Cohausz: Ein Jahrtausend geistliches Damenstift Herford. In: Herforder Jahrbuch I. 1960
 Herforder Geschichtsquellen. 1968
 R. Pape: Waltger und die Gründung Herfords. 1988
 R. Pape: Herford zur Kaiserzeit. 1989
 R. Pape: Sancta Herfordia. Geschichte Herfords von den Anfängen bis zur Gegenwart. 1989
 T. Helmert-Corvey (Hg.): 1200 Jahre Herford. 1989
 H. Bei der Wieden: Die Äbtissinnen der Reichsabtei Herford in der Neuzeit. In: Historisches Jahrbuch für den Kreis Herford 2000. 1999
 H. Bei der Wieden: Die Herkunft der Äbtissinnen der Reichsabtei Herford vom Ende des 13. bis zur Mitte des 17. Jahrhunderts. In: Historisches Jahrbuch für den Kreis Herford 2002/2003. 2002

External links

Monasteries in North Rhine-Westphalia
Imperial abbeys disestablished in 1802–03
Lutheran women's religious houses
Buildings and structures in Herford (district)
8th-century establishments in Germany
Churches completed in 789
8th-century churches in Germany